Horsepool may refer to:

Places in the United Kingdom
 Horsepool, a lost settlement in Nottinghamshire, England
 Horsepool Farmhouse, Chevington, Suffolk
 Horsepools, a place in Gloucestershire, England

People
 Mandy Horsepool (born 1959), a British speed skater
 Stuart Horsepool, a British speed skater at the 1988 and 1992 Olympics

Other uses
 Beryl Horsepool-Worthingham, a character in The Ear, the Eye and the Arm